A broom is a cleaning tool which also had other uses (e.g. magical and punitive).

Broom may also refer to:

People
Broom (surname)

Places
Broom, Bedfordshire, England
Broom, Cumbria, England
Park Broom, Cumbria, England
Broom, a neighbourhood of Newton Mearns, East Renfrewshire, Scotland
Broom, South Yorkshire, England
Broom, Warwickshire, England
Broom, Pembrokeshire, Wales, in Kilgetty/Begelly community
Loch Broom, Scotland

Other uses
Broom (plant), a group of shrubs
Broom: An International Magazine of the Arts, a modernist literary magazine
Equipment used in broomball
Broom (album), an album by the American band Someone Still Loves You Boris Yeltsin

See also
Brome (disambiguation)
Broome (disambiguation)